Total enclosure fetishism is a form of sexual fetishism whereby a person becomes aroused when having entire body enclosed in a certain way. Total enclosure is often accompanied by some element of bondage.

Examples

Some total enclosure activities include:
 In rubber fetishism, rubber suits, gas masks and similar garments and accessories are used for total enclosure.
 Vacuum beds rigidly enclose the entire body under a rubber sheet with a small breathing tube.
 Sleepsacks and body bags are also used as less rigid enclosure alternative to the vacuum beds, although some are made in inflatable form to increase pressure on the occupant's body.
 In spandex fetishism, zentai suits are used for total enclosure in skintight fabric from head to toe.  In the case of zentai, the wearer breathes through the loose-woven fabric itself, the garment is not as tight as a rubber or PVC garment would be, and the costume generally comes off with a zipper that can be operated by the wearer.
 Being sealed within a giant stuffed animal or murrsuit (sexual fursuit).

Although experiences of these activities are regarded as claustrophobic, total enclosure fetishists like to practice these activities, sometimes combining them with bondage to intensify feelings of helplessness.

Risks 
As with all activities involving bondage or potential risk to breathing, this is a risky activity. Maintaining an airway, preventing positional asphyxia, and ensuring that the enclosed person has a means of escape at all times are of paramount importance, if these activities are not to result in death.

See the articles on bondage and erotic asphyxiation for some discussion of the risks involved.

See also 
Bondage (BDSM)
Bondage hood
BDSM
Partialism
Mummification (BDSM)

Sources
 Gillian Freeman, "The Undergrowth of Literature", Nelson, 1967, pp. 141–143
 David Kunzle, "Fashion and fetishism: a social history of the corset, tight-lacing, and other forms of body-sculpture in the West", Rowman and Littlefield, 1982, p. 39
 Simon LeVay, Sharon McBride Valente, "Human sexuality", Sinauer Associates, 2006, p. 494
 http://en.wikifur.com/wiki/Murrsuit

Fashion-related fetishism